Yasser Talaat Hafez Thabet is an acclaimed Egyptian journalist and liberal writer.

Biography
Born on 7 May 1964 in Cologne, Germany, Thabet gained a BA in Journalism from the Mass Communication Faculty at Cairo University, Egypt in May 1985 and a master's degree in Journalism from the Centre for Journalism Studies, University of Wales, Cardiff in 1998. In September 2000, he gained his PhD degree in Journalism from Boston University, US.

While studying at Cairo University, he was selected to head the foreign affairs department at the University newspaper, Sawt Al-Gamea, Arabic for "Voice of the University". 
He started his professional career at Al-Ahram when he was a student and continued his career as a Foreign Affairs Editor until he resigned in 2006.

Career

Yasser Thabet was among the main journalists who started a unique experience in Egyptian journalism, called Independent Journalism. The cornerstone of this experience was the widespread newspaper [Al-Dostour]. In 1991, he was among the founders of the first daily business newspaper in Egypt, titled Al Alam Al Youm, Arabic for "World Today". In 2001, he became the managing editor of Sawt Al-Ummah private-owned newspaper, before leaving for Qatar in August 2002 to be Senior Producer of Al-Jazeera Channel.

In March 2007, he travelled to US where he started his new post as the chief editor of Al-Hurra Channel. It was a brief work experience. However, some US writers and researchers praised Thabet's highly revered legacy and outstanding journalistic achievements.

Thabet became Program Editor of Al-Arabiya Channel in Dubai, United Arab Emirates, starting November 2007, before joining Sky News Arabia Channel in Abu Dhabi, UAE, as Director of Output, starting June 2011.

Thabet gave presentations on media issues in UK, Austria, Spain, Turkey, Greece, Canada and US. He has been on the faculty panel of the Salzburg Seminars on two occasions. On 11 June 2009, Yasser Thabet was a speaker at a conference titled Civilian Capacity Building and Democratic Consciousness Raising in Security and Human Rights which was organized in Ankara, Turkey by The Turkish Economic and Social Studies Foundation (TESEV).

Blogging
Thabet writes regularly in his well-known blog Qabl Al-Tofan, Arabic for Before The Deluge about history, literature and even sports in a distinguished and articulated style.

On 27 November 2008, The Deutsche Welle International Weblog Awards—The BOBs –announced that "Before the Deluge" won the People's Choice prize as the Best Weblog Arabic .
The jury said that "Yasser's entries about historical figures and events tends to be among the Arab blogsphere's most well-researched posts. An established journalist and talented, creative storyteller, he gives his readers a new view on old stories".

Books
Thabet is a leading fiction writer and historian of media, politics and sports in the Middle East. 
Preoccupied with the problems of death and suffering, his literary works belong to the fantastic and autobiographical genres.
His list of books includes the following:

 Tarekh ālġhenāʾ ālšhaʿby: Min ālmawwāl ila ālrāb (History of Popular Singing: From Mawwal to Rapping) (2023) Cairo:  Dār Dawen.
	Tarekh ālyahwd fi miṣr wālʿālm ālʿarby: Sanwāt ālẓel wālġhomwḍ (History of Jews in Egypt and Arab World: Years of Shadow and Mystery) (2023) Cairo: Dawen Publishing.
	Miṣr ālmodhešha (Amazing Egypt) (2023) Cairo: Ibiidi Publishing.
	Sīrat ālġhobār (The Dust Memoirs) (2023) Cairo: Dār Zein.
	10 qobolāt mansīyah (10 Forgotten Kisses) (2023) Cairo: Dār Zein.
	Mišhwār ālkoẖlod: Sīrat Moḥamed Salāḥ (The Eternity Course: Mohamed Salah’s Memoirs) (2023) Cairo: Dār Oktob.
	Generālāt kurat al-qadam: Min Maradona ila Haaland (Soccer Generals: From Maradona to Haaland) (2023) Cairo: Dār Oktob.
	Game’a al-shahawat (The Desires Collector) - (2022) Cairo: Dār Zein.
	Saqf al‘alam (Roof of  the World) - (2022) Cairo: Dār Zein.
	Kol youm Shawq (Everyday a Longing) – (2021) Cairo: Dār Merit. 
	Almusiqaa alaria: 'asatir fi amlakat alghina' (The Naked Music: Legends in The Music Kingdom) - (2021) Cairo: Dār Zein.
	Tuqus aljunun (Rites of Madness) -(2021) Cairo: Ibiidi Publishing.
	Mkamat alrouh: Dalil ila al-oghniah ala'rbiah (The Soul Standings: A Guide to the Arabic Song) - (2021) Amman: Dār Khtot wthelal.
	Revolutions: How they changed history and what they mean today, Peter Furtado (editor), London: Thames & Hudson Ltd, 2020.
	Hkmah alsikan (The Wisdom of the Legs) - (2020) Cairo: Ibiidi Publishing.
	Ṣirā’ taht al-kobah (Conflict under the Doom) - (2020) Cairo: Dār Zein.
	Al-roumansyoun (The Romantics) - (2020) Cairo: Dār Zein. 
	A’adat al-hob al-sia’ah (Bad Love Habits) - (2020) Cairo: Dār Uktub.
	Khodoush Idhafiah (Additional Scratches) - (2020) Cairo: Dar al-adham.
	Ithm Kadim (An Old Sin) - (2019) Cairo: Dar al-adham.
	Wala’ (Fondness) - (2019) Cairo: Dār al-adham.
	Al-harb fi Manzl Taha Hussein (The War inside Taha Hussein's House) - (2019) Cairo: Dār Zein.
	O'shak wa Shyatin: Tarikh al-sinma al-Mamnoua' (Lovers and Demons: The Forbidden History of Cinema) - (2019) Cairo: Dār Uktub.
	A'bna'a al-boka'a (Sons of Crying) - (2019) Cairo: Dār Zein.
	Al-a'hdaf La Ta'tthr (Goals Don’t Apologize) - (2019) Cairo: Dār Uktub. 
  Mraa'i al-tha'ab (Pastures of Wolves) - (2018) Cairo: Dār Zein. 
  Yotel al-khajal min hakebateha (Shyness overlooks from her Bag) - (2018) Cairo: Dār Zein.
	Al-malek wal-fursan al-arab'ah:  Arab Russia 2018 (The King and Four Knights: Russia's Arabs in 2018) - (2018) Cairo: Kunūz.
	Mawsoua't Ka'as Al-Alam: Min Uruguay 1930 ila Russia 2018 (World Cup Encyclopedia:  From Uruguay 1930 to Russia 2018) - (2018) Cairo: Kunūz.
	Qabl al-throuah bikalil (Just before Climax) - (2018) Cairo: Dār Zein.
	Kanoun ra's al-samakah: Ummah fi Khatar (The Fish Head Law: A Nation in Danger)- (2018) Cairo: Dār Delta.
	Al-Jish wal-Daoulah: Idarat al-Bilad wal-ibad (The Army and State: Administering the Country and People) - (2018) Cairo: Dār Zein.
	Losous wa Awtan (Thieves and Countries) - (2018) Cairo: Markaz al-Ḥaḍārah al-ʻArabīyah.
	Fasedoun wallah a'alam (Corrupt People – God Knows Best) - (2017) Cairo: Dār Delta.
	Al-Wazīr fī al-thallājah: Kawalees Sena'at wa Inheyar Al-Hokoumat fi Misr (The Minister in the Fridge: The Backstage Formation and Fall of Governments in Egypt) - (2017) Cairo: Dār Delta.
	Ahl al-ḍaḥik wa-al-ʻadhāb (The People of Laughter and Anguish) - (2017) Cairo: Dār Uktub.
	Sīrat al-ladhdhah wa-al-jins fī Miṣr (The Biography of Pleasure and Sex in Egypt) - (2017) Cairo: Dār Uktub.
 Seerat Al-Latha wal-Jens fi Misr (The Biography of Pleasure and Sex in Egypt  (2017) Cairo: Dar Oktob.
 Mawsoua't Hassad Al-Olympiad: Al-Dawrat Al-Olympiya fi 120 Sanah  (Summer Olympics Encyclopedia: Olympic Games in 120 Years)  (2016) Cairo: Kenouz.
 Pashawat wa Obash: Al-Tareekh Al-Siri lil-fasad (Pashas and Canaille: The Secret History of Corruption)   (2016) Cairo: Markaz Al-Hadhara Al-Arabiya.
 Khenjr fil Mira'ah: Nossos wa Woujouh Mansiya (A Dagger in The Mirror: Forgotten Texts and Faces)   (2016) Cairo: Dar Oktob.
 Al-Mawt 'ala El-Tareeka El-Misriya (Death on the Egyptian Way)  (2016) Cairo: Dar Oktob.
 Har'ek Al-Tafkeer wal Takfeer (Fires of Thinking and Excommunication)   (2016) Cairo: Dar Oktob.
 Jamrtan: Tamareen 'ala El-Nesyan (Two Embers: Exercises on Forgetfulness)   (2016) Cairo: Dar Oktob.
 Al-A'sa wal-Matrakah: Sera'a Al-Solta wal-Kadha' (The Stick and Hammer: the Struggle between Power and Judiciary), (2015) Cairo: Dar Oktob 
 Watan Mahalak Ser (A Home Which Rounds in Circles), (2015) Cairo: Dar Oktob 
 Al-Mutala'boun bel-'ouqool: Saqtat Al-I'lam fi Misr (Mind Manipulators: Media Lapses in Egypt), (2015) Cairo: Dar Oktob.
 Sadiq Al-Rais: Hokam Misr Al-Seryoun (The President's Friend: Egypt Secret Rulers), (2015) Cairo: Dar Oktob  
 Horoub Al-Hawanem (Ladies Wars), (2015) Cairo: Dar Oktob  
 Deen Misr: Omaraa Al-Dam wal-Video (Egypt's Religion: Warlords of Blood and Video), (2015) Cairo: Dar Oktob
 Hokam Misr min Al-Malakiya ila Al-Sisi (Egypt Rulers from Kingdom to Al-Sisi), (2015) Cairo: Dar Al-Hayat
 Misr Qabl Al-Montage (Egypt before Editing), (2015) Cairo: Dar Delta
 Ghorfat Khal'a El-Malabes: Wogoh wa Keyasat (Fitting Room: Faces and Measurements), (2014) Cairo: Dar Oktob   
 Zanb (Guilt), (2014) Cairo: Dar Oktob      
 Agmal Al-Ktalah (The Most Beautiful Killers), (2014) Cairo: Dar Oktob  
 Al-Sera'a ala Misr: The'ab Mubarak wal-Ahd Al-Gadeed (Conflict over Egypt: Mubarak Wolves and the New Era), (2014) Cairo: Kenouz  
 Ayamona Al-Mansiya (Our Forgotten Days), (2014) Beirut: Difaf/ Algiers: Al-Ikhtlaf 
 Tahta Me'taf Al-Gharam (Under the Passion Coat), (2014) Cairo: Dar Oktob  
 Morawadah (Courting), (2014) Cairo: Dar Oktob 
 Zaman Al-'Aela: Safaqat Al-Mal wal-Ikhwan wal-Solta (The Age of Family: Money, Muslim Brotherhood and Power Deals), (2014) Cairo: Dar Merit  
 Sena'at Al-Tagheyah: Soqout Al-Nokhab wa Bozor Al-Istebdad (Creating the Tyrant: The Fall of the Elites and the Seeds of Despotism), (2013) Cairo: Dar Oktob

 Ra'is Al-Foras Al-Dhaa'a'ah: Morsi Bayn Misr wal-Jamaa'ah (President of Missed Opportunities: Morsi between Egypt and the Group), (2013) Cairo: Dar Oktob 
 Horoub Al-Asheera: Morsi fi Shohor Al-Reeba (Clan Wars: Morsi in Suspicion Months), (2013) Cairo: Dar Oktob  
 Mohakmet Al-Ra'is: Al-Bahth a'n Al-Kanoun Al-Ghaa'b (The President on Trial: In search of a Lost Law) – (2013) Cairo: Dar Oktob  
 Dawlat Al-Ultras: Asfar Al-Thawrah wa El-Mazbaha (The State of Ultras: Tales of Revolution and Massacre) – (2013) Cairo: Dar Oktob  .
 Qisat Al-Tharwah fi Misr (Story of Wealth in Egypt) – (2012) Cairo: Dar Merit  .
 Shahqat Al-Ya'eseen: Al-Intihar fi Al'alm Al-Arabi (Gasp of the Desperate: Suicide in the Arab World) – (2012) Cairo: Dar Al-Tanweer .
 Fidhat Al-Dahshah (Silver of Surprise) – (2012) Cairo: Dar Al-Ein .
 Haya Bena Nal'ab: An Al-Awtan wa Al-Awthan(Let Us Play: About Homelands and Pagan Idols) – (2012) Cairo: Dar Oktob .
 Lahazat Twitter (Twitter Moments) – (2011) Cairo: Dar Al-Ein  .
 Futuwat wa Effendiya (Bullies and Effendis) – (2010) Cairo: Dar Sefsafa  .
 Horoub Korat Al-Qadam (Soccer Wars) – (2010) Cairo: Dar Al-Ein  .
 Jra'im bil-Hibr Al-Siri (Crimes in Invisible Ink) – (2010) Cairo: Markaz Al-Hadhara Al-Arabiya .
 Kitab Al-Raghba (Book of Desire) – (2010) Beirut: Arab Scientific Publishers, Inc .
 Film Masri Taweel (A Long Egyptian Film) – (2010) Cairo: Markaz Al-Hadhara Al-Arabiya .
 Yawmeyat Saher Motaqa'ed (Diraies of a Retired Magician) – (2009) Cairo: Dar Al-Ein .
 Jra'im Al-A'atefah fi Misr Al-Nazefah (Crimes of Passion in Bleeding Egypt)- (2009) Beirut: Arab Scientific Publishers, Inc.
 Qabl Al-Tofan: Al-Tarikh Al-Dha'ia lil-Al-Mahrousa fi Modawana Misryia (Before the Deluge: The Missing History of Egypt in an Egyptian Blog)- (2008) Cairo: Mizan Book.
 Jomhouriyat Al-Fawdha: Qisat Inhisar Al-Watan wa Inkisar Al-Mowatin (The Republic of Chaos: A Story of the Decline of the Nation and the Refraction of the Citizen)- (2008) Cairo: Mizan Book.
 Thakerat Al-Qarn Al-Eshrin (Memory of the 20th Century)- (2002) Cairo: Al-Dar Al-Arabiya Lil-Kitab.
 Mawsoua't Ka'as Al–Alam (World Cup Encyclopedia)- (1994) Cairo: Madbouly Al-Saghir.

References

1964 births
Living people
Cairo University alumni
Egyptian bloggers
21st-century Egyptian historians
Egyptian non-fiction writers
Egyptian newspaper founders